Kalia the Crow is a cartoon character in the popular Indian monthly comic Tinkle. 
Kalia is a crow that usually features in strips of the Kalia the Crow series. Chamataka the jackal and  his accomplice and friend Doob Doob the crocodile are usually featured desperately trying to catch two rabbits, Keechu and Meechu. However, the rabbits are always saved by the clever Kalia. Kalia also has a friend in the female crow named Bhoori.

History
Kalia the Crow made his first appearance in comic format in December 1980, in the first issue of Tinkle (No. 1). Luis Fernandes, a former editor of Tinkle magazine, and an integral member of the Tinkle creative team, was the original creator of Kalia. The first artist was Pradeep Sathe. Sathe believed that the cartoonisation of an animal should not result in distortion of the animal's anatomy. This line of thought is current even today. The later artists were Prasad Iyer, C.D. Rane and currently, Juee Rane.

Characters
Kalia the clever crow, who always manages to save his friends from trouble, is very alert and observant.  Using his brilliant schemes, he manages to save various animals from the clutches of Chamataka and Doob Doob.

 is a jackal that usually features as the chief villain in strips of the Kalia the Crow series. He is usually seen working together with his accomplice and friend Doob Doob, the crocodile. Most plots feature the two trying to catch prey, usually the two rabbits, Keechu and Meechu, and coming up with a variety of schemes to do so. The prey, however, are always saved by the clever Kalia, making him Chamataka and Doob Doob's chief enemy. Kalia has nevertheless saved their lives too on some occasions. He has a she-jackal friend named Chamataki.

Doob Doob the crocodile is a loyal friend of Chamataka, and is somewhat dimwitted. He usually dislikes Kalia but is sometimes used by Kalia to save the rabbits. Doob Doob cherishes a dream of being able to fly. Doob Doob has a fiancée named Lubdubi.

Keechu and Meechu are the two rabbits who are always the target of Chamataka, in almost every episode.

Shonar is a spotted deer that appears occasionally in the comics. Normally he is also a target of the Chamataka and Doob Doob, but is always saved by Kalia.

Babloo is a bear who is friend of Kalia. He is always angry with Chamataka because Chamataka frequently steals his precious honeycombs. Chamataka is very much afraid of being caught by Babloo as he has been punished by Babloo many times for the thefts. Kalia often "uses" Babloo to save the other animals from Chamataka.

Kalia's other lesser known friends are Sayal the porcupine, Sundar the peacock, Sundari the peahen, an elephant (referred to as Brother Elephant), and a bison. Many other creatures that are found in an Indian jungle, and those who have escaped from a zoo or a circus, and some domestic animals make their appearances in various episodes. Currently stories are made on Kalia and Coco for the Chocos ad.

See also
 Indian Comics
 Tinkle

References

External links
 Tinkle

Indian comics